Kunaparaju Parava is a  village in Reddigudem Mandal in Krishna District, Andhra Pradesh, India.

References

Villages in Krishna district